The 40th Merdeka Tournament was played from 15 to 25 October 2008. The tournament was won by Vietnam, who defeated Malaysia 6-5 on penalties in the final.

Teams

 (host country)
*

**
***

*Mozambique replaced Kazakhstan following Kazakhstan’s failure to confirm participation. Mozambique will play with their Under 20 squad.

**Sierra Leone will be sending their Under 20 squad.

***Vietnam will be sending their Under 22 squad.

Stadiums

*Venue for last group match change because of the poor pitch condition at the MBPJ Stadium.

Group stages
All times local (UTC+8)

Group A

Group B

Knockout stages
All times local (UTC+8)

Bracket

Semi-finals

Final

Winners

Goalscorers

5 goals
 Mohd Safee Mohd Sali

4 goals
 Indra Putra Mahayuddin
 Phan Thanh Bình

3 goals
 Dwight Foray

2 goals
 Mohd Zaquan Adha Abdul Radzak
 Mohd Ashaari Shamsuddin
 Alusine Turay
 Mohamed Kabia
 Hoàng Đình Tùng
 Nguyễn Đức Thiện
 Trịnh Quang Vinh
 Soe Myat Min

1 goals
 Lahai Freeman
 Lajor Bah
 Sulaiman Kamara
 Amara Kamara
 Mohd Amirul Hadi Zainal
 Hairuddin Omar
 Mohd Nizaruddin Yusof
 Mohd Khyril Muhymeen Zambri
 Mohd Aidil Zafuan Abdul Radzak
 Hafizullah Qadami
 Hashmatullah Barakzai
 Sayed Bashir Azimi
 Jahid Hasan Ameli
 Zahid Hossain
 Jumanu Rai
 Anil Gurung

 Bijaya Gurung
 Franciso Jange
 Enio Saize
 Mauricio Peguenino
 Zaw Htet Aung
 Min Thu
 Khin Maung Lwin
 Nguyễn Văn Khải

References

2008
2008 in Malaysian football
2008 in Afghan football
2008 in Burmese football
2008 in Nepalese sport
2008 in Sierra Leonean sport
2008 in Vietnamese football
2008 in Bangladeshi football
mer
Mer